Guča (Serbian Cyrillic: Гуча, pronounced ) is a small town located in the Lučani municipality, Moravica District, Serbia. As of 2011 census, it has a population of 3,710 inhabitants. It is famous for its annual Guča trumpet festival, which is held in town and is attended by several hundred thousand visitors each year.

Administrative divisions
Guča was a separate municipality until 1965, when it was incorporated into the municipality of Lučani. For census purposes, Guča is divided into two adjacent settlements, northern Guča (selo) (lit. Guča Village, population 1,955) and southern Guča (varošica) (lit. Guča Town, 1,755), separated by the Bjelica river.

Guča trumpet festival

The Guča trumpet festival, also known as the Dragačevo Assembly is an annual trumpet festival held in Guča. 900,000 visitors (estimation by the promoter) make their way to the town of 2,000 people every year, both from Serbia and abroad.  Elimination heats earlier in the year mean only a few dozen bands get to compete. Guča’s official festival is split into three parts. Friday’s opening concert, Saturday night celebrations and Sunday’s competition. Friday’s concerts are held at the entrance to the official Guča Festival building. This event features previous winners, each orkestar getting to play three tunes while folk dancers, all kitted out in bright knitting patterns, dance kolos and oros in front of a hyped-up audience.

In 2010, Guča celebrated its 50th anniversary and it was opened by the then Serbian President Boris Tadić.

References

External links

 Brasslands – a documentary film by the Meerkat Media Collective shot at the 50th anniversary of the Guča trumpet competition

 www.gucafilm.com – documentary filmed in Guča, following two young contenders for the coveted 'Golden Trumpet' award.
 Trumpets' Republic — A documentary film by Stefano Missio & Alessandro Gori

Populated places in Moravica District